Saint-Louis-de-Gonzague-du-Cap-Tourmente is a parish municipality in Quebec, Canada.

Its population in the Canada 2021 Census was 0. It is a relic of the seigneurial system of New France.

Geography
Saint-Louis-de-Gonzague-du-Cap-Tourmente is a small enclave within the municipality of Saint-Joachim, at the foot of Cape Tourmente, and east of Sainte-Anne-de-Beaupré, in the regional county municipality of La Côte-de-Beaupré in the region of Capitale-Nationale.

Located near the provincial capital of Quebec City, it is part of the Communauté métropolitaine de Québec.

History
Named for Saint Aloysius Gonzaga and Cap Tourmente, a stormy promontory named by Samuel de Champlain, the municipality was set up in 1917 by a law that detached certain buildings and lands belonging to the Séminaire de Québec from the parish of Saint-Joachim in order to avoid paying municipal taxes and fees. At that time, it had an area of several square kilometres, including farmland; however, the law specified that if the Séminaire sold any of its property, it would revert to Saint-Joachim.

By and by, all of the Séminaire's property was sold and was thereby returned to Saint-Joachim, except for the Petit-Cap property, which now constitutes the entire territory of the municipality.

Government
The municipality is not governed by a municipal council but by the Board of Directors of the Séminaire de Québec. As such, it does not have a mayor but rather an administrator.

Demographics 

Population trend:
 Population in 2021: 0 
 Population in 2016: 5 
 Population in 2011: 5 (revised from 18 by Statistics Canada)
 Population in 2006: 0
 Population in 2001: 0
 Population in 1996: 4
 Population in 1991: 6

See also
 Notre-Dame-des-Anges, Quebec
 List of parish municipalities in Quebec

References

External links

  Municipal arms

 

Parish municipalities in Quebec
Incorporated places in Capitale-Nationale